Stéphane Gomes Gonçalves (born 2 May 1996) is a Portuguese footballer who plays as a left winger for Echallens.

Career
On 22 May 2015, Gonçalves made his professional debut with Lausanne-Sport in a 2014–15 Swiss Challenge League match against Le Mont. He left Lausanne-Sport in 2015, going on to play for Stade Lausanne Ouchy, Vevey Sports, Azzurri 90 LS and FC Echallens

References

External links
 
 

1996 births
Living people
Portuguese footballers
Association football wingers
Swiss Challenge League players
FC Lausanne-Sport players
FC Stade Lausanne Ouchy players
FC Vevey United players
FC Echallens players